Bessel functions, first defined by the mathematician Daniel Bernoulli and then generalized by Friedrich Bessel, are canonical solutions  of Bessel's differential equation

for an arbitrary complex number , the order of the Bessel function.

The most important cases are when  is an integer or half-integer. Bessel functions for integer  are also known as cylinder functions or the cylindrical harmonics because they appear in the solution to Laplace's equation in cylindrical coordinates. Spherical Bessel functions with half-integer  are obtained when the Helmholtz equation is solved in spherical coordinates.

Applications of Bessel functions
The Bessel function is a generalization of the sine function. It can be interpreted as the vibration of a string with variable thickness, variable tension (or both conditions simultaneously); vibrations in a medium with variable properties; vibrations of the disc membrane, etc.

Bessel's equation arises when finding separable solutions to Laplace's equation and the Helmholtz equation in cylindrical or spherical coordinates. Bessel functions are therefore especially important for many problems of wave propagation and static potentials. In solving problems in cylindrical coordinate systems, one obtains Bessel functions of integer order; in spherical problems, one obtains half-integer orders. For example:

 Electromagnetic waves in a cylindrical waveguide
 Pressure amplitudes of inviscid rotational flows
 Heat conduction in a cylindrical object
 Modes of vibration of a thin circular or annular acoustic membrane (such as a drumhead or other membranophone) or thicker plates such as sheet metal (see Kirchhoff–Love plate theory, Mindlin–Reissner plate theory)
 Diffusion problems on a lattice
 Solutions to the radial Schrödinger equation (in spherical and cylindrical coordinates) for a free particle
 Solving for patterns of acoustical radiation
 Frequency-dependent friction in circular pipelines
 Dynamics of floating bodies
 Angular resolution
 Diffraction from helical objects, including DNA
 Probability density function of product of two normally distributed random variables
 Analyzing of the surface waves generated by microtremors, in geophysics and seismology. 

Bessel functions also appear in other problems, such as signal processing (e.g., see FM audio synthesis, Kaiser window, or Bessel filter).

Definitions
Because this is a second-order linear differential equation, there must be two linearly independent solutions. Depending upon the circumstances, however, various formulations of these solutions are convenient. Different variations are summarized in the table below and described in the following sections.

Bessel functions of the first kind: 

For integer or positive , Bessel functions of the first kind are finite at the origin; while for negative non-integer , Bessel functions of the first kind diverge as  approaches zero.

where  is the gamma function, a shifted generalization of the factorial function to non-integer values. The Bessel function of the first kind is an entire function if  is an integer, otherwise it is a multivalued function with singularity at zero.

On the other hand, for integer order , the following relationship is valid (the gamma function has simple poles at each of the non-positive integers):

This means that the two solutions are no longer linearly independent. In this case, the second linearly independent solution is then found to be the Bessel function of the second kind, as discussed below.

Bessel's integrals

which is also called Hansen-Bessel formula.

This was the approach that Bessel used, and from this definition he derived several properties of the function. The definition may be extended to non-integer orders by one of Schläfli's integrals, for :

Relation to hypergeometric series
The Bessel functions can be expressed in terms of the generalized hypergeometric series as

This expression is related to the development of Bessel functions in terms of the Bessel–Clifford function.

Relation to Laguerre polynomials
In terms of the Laguerre polynomials  and arbitrarily chosen parameter , the Bessel function can be expressed as

Bessel functions of the second kind: 

In the case of integer order , the function is defined by taking the limit as a non-integer  tends to :

If  is a nonnegative integer, we have the series

where  is the digamma function, the logarithmic derivative of the gamma function.

There is also a corresponding integral formula (for ):

In the case where ,

 is necessary as the second linearly independent solution of the Bessel's equation when  is an integer. But  has more meaning than that. See also the subsection on Hankel functions below.

When  is an integer, moreover, as was similarly the case for the functions of the first kind, the following relationship is valid:

The Bessel functions of the second kind when  is an integer is an example of the second kind of solution in Fuchs's theorem.

Hankel functions: , 

where  is the imaginary unit. These linear combinations are also known as Bessel functions of the third kind; they are two linearly independent solutions of Bessel's differential equation. They are named after Hermann Hankel.

These forms of linear combination satisfy numerous simple-looking properties, like asymptotic formulae or integral representations. Here, "simple" means an appearance of a factor of the form . For real  where ,  are real-valued, the Bessel functions of the first and second kind are the real and imaginary parts, respectively, of the first Hankel function and the real and negative imaginary parts of the second Hankel function.

The Hankel functions are used to express outward- and inward-propagating cylindrical-wave solutions of the cylindrical wave equation, respectively (or vice versa, depending on the sign convention for the frequency).

Using the previous relationships, they can be expressed as

If  is an integer, the limit has to be calculated. The following relationships are valid, whether  is an integer or not:

In particular, if  with  a nonnegative integer, the above relations imply directly that

These are useful in developing the spherical Bessel functions (see below).

The Hankel functions admit the following integral representations for :

Modified Bessel functions: , 
The Bessel functions are valid even for complex arguments , and an important special case is that of a purely imaginary argument. In this case, the solutions to the Bessel equation are called the modified Bessel functions (or occasionally the hyperbolic Bessel functions) of the first and second kind and are defined as

when  is not an integer; when  is an integer, then the limit is used. These are chosen to be real-valued for real and positive arguments .

 can be expressed in terms of Hankel functions:

Using these two formulae the result to +, commonly known as Nicholson's integral or Nicholson's formula, can be obtained to give the following

given that the condition  is met. It can also be shown that

only when || <  and  but not when .

We can express the first and second Bessel functions in terms of the modified Bessel functions (these are valid if ):

Two integral formulas for the modified Bessel functions are (for ):

Bessel functions can be described as Fourier transforms of powers of quadratic functions. For example (for ):

This is done by integrating a closed curve in the first quadrant of the complex plane.

Modified Bessel functions  and  can be represented in terms of rapidly convergent integrals

The modified Bessel function  is useful to represent the Laplace distribution as an Exponential-scale mixture of normal distributions.

The modified Bessel function of the second kind has also been called by the following names (now rare):

 Basset function after Alfred Barnard Basset
 Modified Bessel function of the third kind
 Modified Hankel function
 Macdonald function after Hector Munro Macdonald

Spherical Bessel functions: , 

When solving the Helmholtz equation in spherical coordinates by separation of variables, the radial equation has the form

From the relations to the ordinary Bessel functions it is directly seen that:

The spherical Bessel functions can also be written as (Rayleigh's formulas)

The zeroth spherical Bessel function  is also known as the (unnormalized) sinc function. The first few spherical Bessel functions are:

and

Generating function
The spherical Bessel functions have the generating functions

Differential relations

Spherical Hankel functions: , 

There are also spherical analogues of the Hankel functions:

In fact, there are simple closed-form expressions for the Bessel functions of half-integer order in terms of the standard trigonometric functions, and therefore for the spherical Bessel functions. In particular, for non-negative integers :

The spherical Hankel functions appear in problems involving spherical wave propagation, for example in the multipole expansion of the electromagnetic field.

Riccati–Bessel functions only slightly differ from spherical Bessel functions:

They satisfy the differential equation

For example, this kind of differential equation appears in quantum mechanics while solving the radial component of the Schrödinger's equation with hypothetical cylindrical infinite potential barrier. This differential equation, and the Riccati–Bessel solutions, also arises in the problem of scattering of electromagnetic waves by a sphere, known as Mie scattering after the first published solution by Mie (1908). See e.g., Du (2004) for recent developments and references.

Asymptotic forms
The Bessel functions have the following asymptotic forms. For small arguments , one obtains, when  is not a negative integer:

When  is a negative integer, we have

For the Bessel function of the second kind we have three cases:

where  is the Euler–Mascheroni constant (0.5772...).

For large real arguments , one cannot write a true asymptotic form for Bessel functions of the first and second kind (unless  is half-integer) because they have zeros all the way out to infinity, which would have to be matched exactly by any asymptotic expansion. However, for a given value of  one can write an equation containing a term of order :

(For  the last terms in these formulas drop out completely; see the spherical Bessel functions above.) Even though these equations are true, better approximations may be available for complex . For example,  when  is near the negative real line is approximated better by

than by

The asymptotic forms for the Hankel functions are:

It is interesting that although the Bessel function of the first kind is the average of the two Hankel functions,  is not asymptotic to the average of these two asymptotic forms when  is negative (because one or the other will not be correct there, depending on the  used). But the asymptotic forms for the Hankel functions permit us to write asymptotic forms for the Bessel functions of first and second kinds for complex (non-real)  so long as  goes to infinity at a constant phase angle  (using the square root having positive real part):

For the modified Bessel functions, Hankel developed asymptotic (large argument) expansions as well:

There is also the asymptotic form (for large real )

When , all the terms except the first vanish, and we have

For small arguments , we have

Properties

For integer order ,  is often defined via a Laurent series for a generating function:

an approach used by P. A. Hansen in 1843. (This can be generalized to non-integer order by contour integration or other methods.)

A series expansion using Bessel functions (Kapteyn series) is
 

Another important relation for integer orders is the Jacobi–Anger expansion:

and

which is used to expand a plane wave as a sum of cylindrical waves, or to find the Fourier series of a tone-modulated FM signal.

More generally, a series

The coefficients for  have the explicit form

where  is Neumann's polynomial.

Selected functions admit the special representation

with

due to the orthogonality relation

More generally, if  has a branch-point near the origin of such a nature that

then

or

Another way to define the Bessel functions is the Poisson representation formula and the Mehler-Sonine formula:

This formula is useful especially when working with Fourier transforms.

In particular, it follows that:

This orthogonality relation can then be used to extract the coefficients in the Fourier–Bessel series, where a function is expanded in the basis of the functions  for fixed  and varying .

An analogous relationship for the spherical Bessel functions follows immediately:

If one defines a boxcar function of  that depends on a small parameter  as:

(where  is the rectangle function) then the Hankel transform of it (of any given order ), approaches  as  approaches zero, for any given .

which is zero everywhere except near 1. As  approaches zero, the right-hand side approaches , where  is the Dirac delta function. This admits the limit (in the distributional sense):

A change of variables then yields the closure equation:

The Hankel transform can express a fairly arbitrary function as an integral of Bessel functions of different scales. For the spherical Bessel functions the orthogonality relation is:

Another important property of Bessel's equations, which follows from Abel's identity, involves the Wronskian of the solutions:

In particular,

and

For , the even entire function of genus 1, has only real zeros. Let

be all its positive zeros, then

(There are a large number of other known integrals and identities that are not reproduced here, but which can be found in the references.)

Recurrence relations

and

These two identities are often combined, e.g. added or subtracted, to yield various other relations. In this way, for example, one can compute Bessel functions of higher orders (or higher derivatives) given the values at lower orders (or lower derivatives). In particular, it follows that

Modified Bessel functions follow similar relations:

and

and

The recurrence relation reads

These recurrence relations are useful for discrete diffusion problems.

Transcendence
The same proof also implies that  is transcendental under the same assumptions.

Multiplication theorem
The Bessel functions obey a multiplication theorem

where  and  may be taken as arbitrary complex numbers.

and

Zeros of the Bessel function

Bourget's hypothesis
This phenomenon is known as Bourget's hypothesis''' after the 19th-century French mathematician who studied Bessel functions. The hypothesis was proved by Carl Ludwig Siegel in 1929.

Transcendence

Numerical approaches

Numerical values
The first zero in J0 (i.e, j0,1, j0,2 and j0,3) occurs at arguments of approximately 2.40483, 5.52008 and 8.65373, respectively.

See also

 Anger function
 Bessel polynomials
 Bessel–Clifford function
 Bessel–Maitland function
 Fourier–Bessel series
 Hahn–Exton -Bessel function
 Hankel transform
 Incomplete Bessel functions
 Jackson -Bessel function
 Kelvin functions
 Kontorovich–Lebedev transform
 Lentz's algorithm
 Lerche–Newberger sum rule
 Lommel function
 Lommel polynomial
 Neumann polynomial
 Schlömilch's series
 Sonine formula
 Struve function
 Vibrations of a circular membrane
 Weber function (defined at Anger function)

Notes

References

 
 Arfken, George B. and Hans J. Weber, Mathematical Methods for Physicists, 6th edition (Harcourt: San Diego, 2005). .
 Bowman, Frank Introduction to Bessel Functions (Dover: New York, 1958). .
 
 .
 .
 B Spain, M. G. Smith, Functions of mathematical physics, Van Nostrand Reinhold Company, London, 1970. Chapter 9 deals with Bessel functions.
 N. M. Temme, Special Functions. An Introduction to the Classical Functions of Mathematical Physics, John Wiley and Sons, Inc., New York, 1996. . Chapter 9 deals with Bessel functions.
 Watson, G. N., A Treatise on the Theory of Bessel Functions, Second Edition'', (1995) Cambridge University Press. .
 .

External links

 .
 .
 .
 Wolfram function pages on Bessel J and Y functions, and modified Bessel I and K functions. Pages include formulas, function evaluators, and plotting calculators.
 
 Bessel functions Jν, Yν, Iν and Kν in Librow Function handbook.
F. W. J. Olver, L. C. Maximon, Bessel Functions (chapter 10 of the Digital Library of Mathematical Functions).

Special hypergeometric functions
Fourier analysis